is an upcoming action role-playing game developed and published by Cygames as part of the Granblue Fantasy franchise.

Development
Granblue Fantasy: Relink was announced under the title of Granblue Fantasy Project Re: Link in August 2016, to be developed by a collaboration between PlatinumGames and Cygames. Some of the game's staff include composers Nobuo Uematsu and Tsutomu Narita, and artist Hideo Minaba. In September 2016, the PlayStation 4 was announced as the target platform. The game is set in the same fictional realm as the original Granblue Fantasy but takes place in a different location, although some characters from the original game will appear.

The first public gameplay was shown at GranBlue Fes 2017. In a late 2017 issue of Dengeki PlayStation, director Tetsuya Fukuhara described some gameplay details - the game includes four person co-operative multiplayer, or, single person play with three AI characters. Its official title, Granblue Fantasy: Relink, was revealed in December 2018. In February 2019 it was announced that PlatinumGames would no longer be involved in the project, leaving Cygames to handle the rest of development. Originally scheduled to be released in 2022, the game will be released for PlayStation 4, PlayStation 5, and Windows in 2023.

Notes

References

External links
 

Upcoming video games scheduled for 2023
Granblue Fantasy
Japanese role-playing video games
Multiplayer and single-player video games
PlayStation 4 games
PlayStation 5 games
Video games developed in Japan
Video games scored by Nobuo Uematsu
Windows games